A list of films produced by the Bollywood film industry based in Mumbai in 1938:

1938
Some of the noteworthy films of 1938:

Street Singer is considered as an "all time classic" from New Theatres Calcutta. The film starred K. L. Saigal, Kanan Devi, Jagdish Sethi and Bikram Kapoor with music by R. C. Boral. Directed by Prafulla Ghosh, the film established Kanan Devi's popularity and her 'melody queen' status. It is also ranked as one of  Saigal's greatest hits, where his rendition of Wajid Ali Shah's bhairavi thumri "Babul Mora Naihar Chhooto Jaye" is considered a classic.
Dharti Mata directed by Nitin Bose for New Theatres, was a social film with a romantic component. The film starred K. L. Saigal, Uma Shashi, Kamlesh Kumari and Jagdish Sethi. It was a bilingual made in Bengali (Desher Maate) (1938) and Hindi at the same time. The film had the classic song, "Duniya Rang Rangili  Baba". It was made against the backdrop of the rural (agriculture) and urban (technology) debate and highlighted the need of technology and new concepts for effective farming. 
Gopal Krishna was a remake of Prabhat Film Company's first silent film Gopal Krishna (1929). The film was made in Hindi and Marathi simultaneously. Directed by Sheikh Fattelal and V. G. Damle, it starred Ram Marathe, Shanta Apte, Ganpatrao, and Parshuram. The music was by Master Krishnarao. Made during the pre-independent India era, the story based on the young Lord Krishna is less mythology and more about a social awareness for change against the British regime. The film was a big success and appreciated for its music and sets.

A-B

C-F

G-J

K-M

N-P

R-S

T-Z

References

External links
asc&title_type=feature&year=1938 Bollywood films of 1938 at the IMDb

1938
Bollywood
Films, Bollywood